The 2010-11 season of the FA Women's Premier League was the 19th season of the former top flight of English women's association football. This season the FA Women's Super League became the top level, superseding a reduced eight-team Premier League National Division.

Although there was no promotion to the FA Women's Super League until at least 2013, two teams were relegated into the Northern and Southern Divisions. The top two from each of these Divisions will then be promoted into a 10-team National Division for 2011-12.

National Division

Top scorers

Northern Division

Southern Division

See also
 National League
 Northern Division
 Southern Division

References

External links
She Kicks article on league constitution
Official website

Eng
women
FA Women's National League seasons
2